Kutno railway station is a railway station in Kutno, in the Łódź Voivodeship, Poland. The station opened in 1861 and is located on the Warsaw–Kunowice railway, Łódź–Kutno railway, Kutno–Piła railway and Kutno–Brodnica railway. The train services are operated by PKP, Koleje Mazowieckie, Koleje Wielkopolskie, Łódzka Kolej Aglomeracyjna and Polregio.

The station is one of the most important stations in the Łódź Voivodeship. Beyond the station, in the direction of Poznań there is a goods station called Kutno Azory.

Modernisation
In 2011, a major renovation of the railway and station began. On 11 June 2012 the rebuilt station was opened for passengers, rebuilt at the cost of over 13 million zł.

Train services
The station is served by the following service(s):

EuroCity services (EC) (EC 95 by DB) (EIC by PKP) Berlin - Frankfurt (Oder) - Rzepin - Poznan - Kutno - Warsaw
EuroNight services (EN) Cologne - Duisburg - Dortmund - Berlin - Frankfurt (Oder) - Poznan - Kutno - Warsaw
Express Intercity services (EIC) Szczecin — Warsaw 
Intercity services Swinoujscie - Szczecin - Stargard - Krzyz - Poznan - Kutno - Warsaw
Intercity services Szczecin - Stargard - Krzyz - Poznan - Kutno - Lowicz - Warsaw - Lublin - Rzeszow - Przemysl
Intercity services Szczecin - Stargard - Krzyz - Poznan - Kutno - Lowicz - Warsaw - Bialystok
Intercity services Zielona Gora - Zbaszynek - Poznan - Kutno - Warsaw
Intercity services Wroclaw - Ostrow Wielkopolskie - Jarocin - Poznan - Kutno - Warsaw
Intercity services Kolobrzeg - Pila - Bydgoszcz - Torun - Kutno - Lowicz - Warsaw
Intercity services Szczecin - Pila - Bydgoszcz - Torun - Kutno - Lowicz - Warsaw - Lublin - Rzeszow - Przemysl
Intercity services Gorzow Wielkopolskie - Krzyz - Pila - Bydgoszcz - Torun - Kutno - Lowicz - Warsaw
Intercity services Gdynia - Gdansk - Bydgoszcz - Torun - Kutno - Lowicz - Warsaw - Lublin - Rzeszow - Zagorz/Przemysl
Intercity services Gdynia - Gdansk - Bydgoszcz - Torun - Kutno - Lodz - Czestochowa - Krakow - Zakopane
Intercity services Szczecin - Stargard - Krzyz - Poznan - Kutno - Lowicz - Lodz - Krakow
Intercity services Bydgoszcz - Gniezno - Poznan - Kutno - Lowicz - Lodz - Krakow
 Intercity services (IC) Łódź Fabryczna — Bydgoszcz — Gdynia Główna
Intercity services (IC) Gdynia - Gdańsk - Bydgoszcz - Toruń - Kutno - Łódź - Częstochowa - Katowice - Bielsko-Biała
 Intercity services (TLK) Gdynia Główna — Bydgoszcz — Łódź — Katowice
 Intercity services (TLK) Gdynia Główna — Grudziądz — Łódź — Katowice
Regional services (PR) Bydgoszcz - Solec Kujawski - Torun - Wloclawek - Kutno
Regional services (PR) Kutno - Lowicz - Skierniewice
Regional services (PR) Torun - Wloclawek - Kutno - Leczyca - Zgierz - Lodz
Regional services (KM) Kutno - Lowicz - Sochaczew - Blonie - Warsaw
Regional services (KM) Sierpc - Plock - Kutno
Regional services (KW) Poznan - Wrzesnia - Konin - Kutno
Regional services (LKA) Kutno - Zgierz - Lodz
Regional services (LKA) Skierniewice - Kutno

References

 This article is based upon a translation of the Polish language version as of July 2016.

External links

Railway stations in Poland opened in 1861
Railway stations in Łódź Voivodeship
Kutno
Railway stations served by Koleje Mazowieckie
Railway stations served by Przewozy Regionalne InterRegio
1861 establishments in the Russian Empire
Railway stations served by Łódzka Kolej Aglomeracyjna